John Grimaldi, better known by his stage name Studebaker John (born November 5, 1952, Chicago, Illinois) is an American blues guitarist and harmonica player. He is a practitioner of the Chicago blues style.

Biography
Studebaker John's father was an amateur musician, and he played early in life at the Maxwell Street flea market. Grimaldi began playing harmonica at age seven. In the 1970s he put together his band, the Hawks, and worked as a construction worker while recording and performing on the side. He recorded extensively for Blind Pig Records in the 1990s. Grimaldi counts Hound Dog Taylor as the reason he began playing slide guitar. Atom Egoyan chose three of John's songs for his 1993 film Calendar, and included two songs in his 1994 film Exotica. In 1995 John played on Little Mack Simmons', High & Lonesome album.

Discography

As leader
Straight No Chaser (Retread Records RRLP-0003, 1979)
Rockin' The Blues '85 (Avanti Records 603071, 1985; CD reissue: Double Trouble 3031, 1992)
Nothin' But Fun (Double Trouble 3025, 1990)
Born To Win (Double Trouble 3027, 1991)
Too Tough (Blind Pig 5010, 1994)
Outside Lookin' In (Blind Pig 5022, 1995)
Tremoluxe (Blind Pig 5031, 1996)
Time Will Tell (Blind Pig 5042, 1997)
Promise Of Love (Avanti [UPC: 800492185656], 2000)
Howl With The Wolf (Evidence 26112, 2001)
Between Life & Death (Avanti [UPC: 620673230827], 2004)
Self-Made Man (Avanti [UPC: 800492176456], 2006)
Waiting On The Sun (Avanti [UPC: 800492193583], 2008)
That's The Way You Do (Delmark 810, 2010) with the Maxwell Street Kings
Old School Rockin''' (Delmark 818, 2012)Kingsville Jukin' (Delmark 830, 2013) with the Maxwell Street KingsEternity's Descent (Avanti [UPC: 692193999515], 2016)Songs for None (Avanti, 2017)The Resonator'' (Avanti, 2020)

References
Footnotes

Further reading
Jason Ankeny, [ Studebaker John] at Allmusic

External links
Studebaker John

1952 births
American blues guitarists
American male guitarists
American blues harmonica players
Slide guitarists
Chicago blues
Living people
Guitarists from Chicago
20th-century American guitarists
20th-century American male musicians
Blind Pig Records artists